The Grand Chancellor (zaixiang, tsai-hsiang), also translated as counselor-in-chief, chancellor, chief councillor, chief minister, imperial chancellor, lieutenant chancellor and prime minister, was the highest-ranking executive official in the imperial Chinese government. The term was known by many different names throughout Chinese history, and the exact extent of the powers associated with the position fluctuated greatly, even during a particular dynasty. During the Six Dynasties period, the term denoted a number of power-holders serving as chief administrators, including zhongshun jian (Inspector General of the Secretariat), zhongshu ling (President of the Secretariat), shizhong (Palace Attendant), shangshu ling and puye (president and vice-president of the Department of State Affairs).

History
In the Spring and Autumn period, Guan Zhong was the first chancellor in China, who became chancellor under the state of Qi in 685 BC. In Qin, during the Warring States period, the chancellor was officially established as "the head of all civil service officials." There were sometimes two chancellors, differentiated as being "of the left" (senior) and "of the right" (junior). After emperor Qin Shi Huang ended the Warring States period by establishing the Qin dynasty (221–206 BC), the chancellor, together with the imperial secretary, and the grand commandant, were the most important officials in the imperial government, generally referred as the Three Lords.

In 1 BC, during the reign of Emperor Ai, the title was changed to da si tu (大司徒). In the Eastern Han dynasty, the chancellor post was replaced by the Three Excellencies: Grand Commandant (太尉), Minister over the Masses (司徒) and Minister of Works (司空). In 190, Dong Zhuo claimed the title "Chancellor of State" (相國) under the powerless Emperor Xian of Han, placing himself above the Three Excellencies. After Dong Zhuo's death in 192, the post was vacant until Cao Cao restored the position as "imperial chancellor" (丞相) and abolished the Three Excellencies in 208. From then until March 15, 220, the power of chancellor was greater than that of the emperor. Later this often happened when a dynasty became weak, usually some decades before the fall of a dynasty.

During the Sui dynasty, the executive officials of the three highest departments of the empire were called "chancellors" (真宰相) together. In the Tang dynasty, the government was divided into three departments: the Department of State Affairs (尚書省), the Secretariat (中書省), and the Chancellery (門下省). The head of each department was generally referred to as the chancellor.

In the Song dynasty, the post of chancellor was also known as the "Tongpingzhangshi" (同平章事), in accordance with late-Tang terminology, while the vice-chancellor was known as the jijunsi. Some years later, the post of chancellor was changed to "prime minister" (首相 shou xiang) and the post of vice-chancellor was changed to "second minister" (次相 ci xiang). In the late Southern Song dynasty, the system changed back to the Tang naming conventions.

During the Mongol-founded Yuan dynasty, the chancellor was not the head of the Secretariat, but the Crown Prince (皇太子) was. After the establishment of the Ming dynasty, the post became the head of the Zhongshu Sheng again. The post was abolished after the execution of Hu Weiyong, who was accused of treason (though his conviction is still strongly disputed in present times because of a lack of evidence to prove his guilt). Still, appointments of the people who held the highest post in the government were called "appointment of prime minister" (拜相) until 1644.

Influence
During and after the Mongol-led Yuan dynasty, the Mongols continued the use of a title Chingsang, from Chengxiang (丞相) for various high leaders, such as Pulad, the Yuan ambassador to the Ilkhan and for the deputy of the Western Mongol leader, the taishi. The title was also used in the Ilkhanate, for the vizier Buqa.

List of chancellors of China

see also

List of chancellors of Shang dynasty

Zhou dynasty
Jiang Ziya
Duke of Zhou
Duke Huan of Zheng
Duke Zhuang of Zheng
Guan Zhong of Qi state (died in 645 BC)
Bao Shuya of Qi state
Yan Ying of Qi state
Fan Li of Qi State and Yue state
Wu Zixu of Wu state
Bo Pi of Wu state
Cheng Dechen of Chu state
Sunshu Ao of Chu state
Wu Qi of Chu state
Lord Chunshen of Chu state
Lord Mengchang of Qi state
Tian Dan of Qi state
Li Kui of Wei state
Hui Shi of Wei State
Lin Xiangru of Zhao state
Li Mu of Zhao state
Su Qin of Yan state
Yue Yi of Yan state
Baili Xi of Qin state
Shang Yang of Qin State
Zhang Yi of Qin State

Qin dynasty

Fan Ju
Lü Buwei (251–238 BCE in office)
Lord Changping
Kui Zhuang
Wang Guan
Li Si (?–208 BCE in office)
Feng Quji
 Zhao Gao (208–207 BCE in office)

Han dynasty

 Xiao He (206–193 BCE in office); Chen Xi (197 BCE), over Zhao
 Cao Shen (193–190 BCE in office)
 Chen Ping (190–179 BCE in office)
 Zhou Bo 
 Guan Ying
 Zhou Yafu
 Huo Guang
 Shi Dan 史丹 (see Emperor Yuan of Han)
 Wang Mang
 Liu Yan (Bosheng)
 Deng Yu (25–27 in office)
 Wu Han
 Yuan An
 Dou Xian
 Li Gu
 Liang Ji
 Dou Wu
 Chen Fan
 Qiao Xuan
 Cao Song
 Zhang Wen
 Liu Yu
 Dong Zhuo
 He Jin
 Wang Yun
 Ma Midi
 Xun Shuang
 Huangfu Song
 Zhu Jun
 Cao Cao (196-220 in office)
 Cao Pi

Three Kingdoms

Eastern Wu
 Sun Shao (221–225)
 Gu Yong (225–243)
 Lu Xun (244–245)
 Bu Zhi (246–247)
 Zhu Ju (249–250)
 Sun Jun (253–256)
 Sun Chen (258)
 Puyang Xing (262–264)
 Zhang Ti (279–280)

Shu Han
 Zhuge Liang (221–234)
 Jiang Wan
 Fei Yi
 Dong Yun
 Jiang Wei
 Dong Jue
 Fan Jian
 Zhuge Zhan

Cao Wei
 Jia Xu
 Hua Xin
 Zhong Yao
 Wang Lang
 Chen Qun
 Dong Zhao
 Cui Lin
 Man Chong
 Jiang Ji
 Cao Shuang
 Sima Yi
 Gao Rou
 Wang Ling
 Zhuge Dan
 Sun Li
 Sima Shi
 Sima Zhao
 Sima Fu
 Wang Chang
 Wang Guan
 Deng Ai
 Zhong Hui
 Sima Yan
 Wang Xiang
 Sima Wang

Sui dynasty
 Gao Jiong
 Li Delin
 Su Wei
 Yang Su
 Yang Guang
 Yang Xiu
 Yang Zhao
 Yang Jian
 Xiao Cong
 Yuwen Shu
 Yu Shiji
 Li Yuan
 Yuwen Huaji
 Wang Shichong
 Li Mi

Tang dynasty

 Li Shimin (618–626 in office) (later Emperor Taizong of Tang)
 Fang Xuanling (626–648 in office)
 Wei Zheng (629–643 in office)
 Cen Wenben (unknown, under Emperor Taizong of Tang)
 Cen Changqian (unknown, under Emperor Gaozong of Tang)
 Cen Xi (unknown, under Emperor Shang of Tang, Emperor Ruizong of Tang and Emperor Xuanzong of Tang)
 Fan Lübing (686–688 in office)
 Di Renjie (691–693, 697–700 in office)
 Yao Chong (698–705, 710–711, 713–716 in office)
 Zhang Jiuling (733–736 in office)
 Li Linfu (734–752 in office)
 Yang Guozhong (752–756 in office)
 Wang Wei (758–759 in office)
 Li Deyu (833–835, 840–846 in office)

Song dynasty

Northern Song
 Fan Zhi (960–964 in office)
 Zhao Pu (964–973, 981–983, 988–992 in office)
 Kou Zhun (1004–1006, 1017–1021 in office)
 Fan Zhongyan (1040–1045 in office)
 Wang Anshi (1067-1075, 1076–1077 in office)
 Sima Guang (1085–1086 in office)
 Fan Chunren (1086– in office)
 Fan Chunli (– in office)
 Zhang Dun (1094–1100 in office)
 Cai Jing (1101–1125 in office)

Southern Song
 Li Gang (1127 in office)
 Zhang Jun (1135–1137 in office)
 Qin Hui (1131–1132, 1137–1155 in office)
 Han Tuozhou (1194–1207 in office)
 Shi Miyuan/Shih Mi-yüan (1207–1233 in office).
 Jia Sidao (1259–1275 in office)
 Chen Yizhong (1275–1276 in office)
 Wen Tianxiang (1275–1278 in office)
 Lu Xiufu (1278–1279 in office)

Ming dynasty
Note: after the death of Hu Weiyong, the title of grand chancellor was abolished. The office of the Grand Secretariat assumed the de facto powers of the chancellery after the reign of the Hongwu Emperor.

 Li Shanchang (1368–1376)
 Hu Weiyong (1376–1380) – The last chancellor of China
 Yang Siqi
 Yan Song (in office 1544–1545)
 Xia Yan (in office 1546–1547)
 Yan Song (2nd time in office 1548–1562)
 Xu Jie
 Gao Gong
 Zhang Juzheng (in office 1572–1582)
 Zhang Siwei
 Shen Shixing
 Wang Jiabing
 Zhao Zhigao
 Wang Xijue
 Zhao Zhigao

Qing dynasty

The Qing dynasty bureaucratic hierarchy did not contain a chancellor position. Instead, the duties normally assumed by a chancellor were entrusted to a series of formal and informal institutions, the most prominent of which was the Grand Council. Occasionally, one minister may held enough power in the government that he comes to be identified, figuratively, as the "chancellor".

In 1911, the Qing court adopted reforms which, amongst other changes, established the position of prime minister. This position existed for less than a year before the Qing government was overthrown.

Premiers after 1911

Gallery

See also 

 Chancellor of the Tang dynasty
 Prime Minister of the Imperial Cabinet
 Menxia Sheng
 List of premiers of China
 Imperial examination
 Chinese law
 Shumishi

References

Citations

Sources 

 
 
 

Xiang
 
Government of Imperial China
Positions of authority